Blue Creek Valley is an  long valley located in northeast Box Elder County, Utah. It is endorheic with the Blue Creek Reservoir its low point located south in the valley's center.

The valley is nestled between three mountainous regions. The West Hills and Blue Spring Hills border it east and southeast. The south abuts the north of the Promontory Mountains, and the west is formed by a small north–south range, the North Promontory Mountains

The north of the valley borders the south of Idaho's Pocatello Valley.

Valley description

Because Blue Creek Valley is narrow, only 5-8 mi wide, small feeder creeks feed the region from the four cardinal directions. Blue Creek Reservoir is located in the center-south of the valley, with Blue Creek Spring located 2 mi northeast, the main feed to the reservoir.

The outlet of Blue Creek Reservoir trends south past Howell, Utah, into agricultural land. A peak associated with the north of the Promontory Mountains ends the valley's south, at the mountain range foothills. The mountain, Engineer Mountain, and parts of the north Promontory Mountains drain north into the south border of Blue Creek Valley; southwest drainage from the mountain region drains southwest into the Bear River Bay section of the northeast Great Salt Lake.

Valley low point
The lowest elevation in the valley is south of Blue Creek Reservoir, its outlet, and to the farmland around Howell, Utah.

References

External links

 Blue Creek Reservoir Fishing, fishworks.com
 valley center: Howell, UT & Blue Creek Reservoir, (topographic map, TopoQuest)
 South Valley, (topographic map, TopoQuest)

Endorheic basins of the United States
Landforms of Box Elder County, Utah
Valleys of Utah